

Schedule 

|-
!colspan=6 style="background:#00539f; color:#FFD200;"| Preseason
|-

|-

|-
!colspan=6 style="background:#00539f; color:#FFD200;"| Regular Season
|-

|-

|-

|-

|-

|-

|-

|-

|-

|-

|-

|-

|-

|-

|-

|-

|-

|-

|-
!colspan=6 style="background:#00539f; color:#FFD200;"| CAA Tournament
|-

|-

|-

|-

See also 

 Delaware Fightin' Blue Hens men's soccer
 2015 NCAA Division I men's soccer season

References 

Delaware Fightin' Blue Hens men's soccer seasons